The Evangelical Council of Venezuela is an organization of evangelical mission agencies in Venezuela. Samuel Olson is the current president, with José Piñero as vice president. The group (unsuccessfully) defended the New Tribes Mission after announcement of their expulsion from Venezuela in 2005 by Hugo Chavez.

References 

Christian missions
Protestantism in Venezuela